Events from the year 1525 in Ireland.

Incumbent
Lord: Henry VIII

Births
Gerald FitzGerald, 11th Earl of Kildare (d. 1585)

References

 
1520s in Ireland
Ireland
Years of the 16th century in Ireland